Malkhedi is a town in Sagar district, Madhya Pradesh, India.

Cities and towns in Sagar district